Sokkanavoor is a village located 8 km from Madukkur of Thanjavur district. This village is named after the Hindu god Sokkanathar (Shivan). Old shiva temple will be found in the head of the village (now partially demolished) which was expected to be built 500 years ago. There is a guess that Sokkanavoor name has been coined because of this temple.
Main business in sokkanavoor is agriculture. Paddy cultivation in sokknavoor is considered to be highest per hectare when compared to other villages of Thanjavur district.
Total population is about 450 people.

References 

Villages in Thanjavur district